Gilbert Olanya is a Ugandan politician who served as a member of the Ugandan Parliament representing Kilak South on the ticket of the Forum for Democratic Change.

Political career 
Olanya was elected to the parliament from Kilak South on the ticket of FDC. He is a member of Acholi Parliamentary Group and serves as Secretary General of the group (APG). During the election of Speaker in the 11th parliament, he kicked against the endorsement of Omoro county legislator Jacob Oulanyah for the office of speaker by APG warning that such endorsement could lead to sectarian and tribal politics which would affect APG if the endorsed candidate fails to win. In June 2020, Olanya was arrested and detained along with a colleague, Samuel Odonga Otto representing Aruu South, and two other persons for staging a protest against the handling of COVID-19 by Gulu Hospital. They were charged with incitement to violence and negligent acts likely to cause the spread of infectious diseases.

References 

Living people
21st-century Ugandan politicians
Forum for Democratic Change politicians
Members of the Parliament of Uganda
Year of birth missing (living people)